Arcesis anax is a moth of the family Tortricidae. It is found in Vietnam, Thailand and Sumatra.

References

Moths described in 1983
Olethreutini
Moths of Asia